James Stephens (died 1683) was an English politician who sat in the House of Commons  between 1656 and 1660.

Stephens was the son of Richard Stephens of Estington and brother of Nathaniel Stephens, MP for Gloucestershire in 1628.   He was Sheriff of Gloucester in 1639 and 1643 and was a member of the Grand Inquest that reported on the houses damaged by a July 1646 siege during the First English Civil War. He was Mayor of Gloucester for 1649–50.

In November 1656, Stephens was returned as Member of Parliament for Gloucester in the Second Protectorate Parliament when the elected candidate John Desborough chose to represent Somerset. Stephens was re-elected MP for Gloucester in 1659 in the Third Protectorate Parliament. He was appointed captain of the militia regiment of foot in Gloucester on 5 April 1660. He was also elected MP for Gloucester in the Convention Parliament in April 1660.
 
Stephens died in 1683 and was buried in St Nicholas' Church on 9 November 1683.

References

Year of birth missing
1683 deaths
Members of the Parliament of England (pre-1707) for Gloucester
English MPs 1656–1658
English MPs 1659
English MPs 1660
Mayors of Gloucester